Twilight of Honor, released in the UK as The Charge is Murder, is a 1963 film directed by Boris Sagal and starring Richard Chamberlain, Nick Adams, Claude Rains, and featuring Joey Heatherton and Linda Evans in their film debuts. Twilight of Honor is a courtroom drama based on Al Dewlen's novel, with a screenplay by Henry Denker. Like the 1959 courtroom drama Anatomy of a Murder, it continued a recent trend of descriptions of things previously never mentioned in American cinema, such as vivid accounts of sexual assault, adultery, and prostitution.

It was Chamberlain's first starring role in a feature.

Plot

David Mitchell (Richard Chamberlain), a widowed lawyer in a small city in New Mexico, is appointed by Judge Tucker to defend Ben Brown (Nick Adams) who has been charged with murder. Norris Bixby, an ambitious local prosecutor, has been assigned to try the case, hoping to fill the shoes of Art Harper (Claude Rains), a famed local prosecutor as well as David's friend and mentor, who is retired.

Mitchell goes to see Art Harper that night to ask for advice and receives a pep-talk from Harper, demanding he use every legal trick in the book to defend his new client. They are interrupted by Susan (Joan Blackman), Harper's daughter, who has romantic feelings for David and who has arrived back in town from Chicago.

During dinner Mitchell says that Ben Brown confessed to the killing and that the prosecution is asking for the gas chamber. He knows that Brown is unlikely to get a fair trial in town, and even he confesses to having preconceived notions about him.

Harper says he played a role in Mitchell's being appointed as the defense on the case, and that while he himself is not healthy enough to defend the case personally, he will help Mitchell try to obtain justice for the accused. Susan also volunteers to be his legal secretary, hoping to spend time with Mitchell.

The next morning, Mitchell goes to the prison to see his new client. He runs into Ben's wife, Laura-Mae Brown (Joey Heatherton), who turned her husband in and who reveals that she despises her husband, and "hopes he croaks," claiming Ben frequently beat her.

She says he murdered a man in a bungled robbery attempt, then fled in the man's car. She also claims that her husband is a compulsive liar and that Mitchell didn't run into her by chance; Bixby wanted her to talk to him, to make it appear the trial will be fair. Despite what his wife said about him, Ben appears to be only concerned with his wife's freedom, claiming he wants her to have a good lawyer. Ben says that he was starved, threatened, and beaten into signing the confession. He also reveals that a second confession was sought and that parts of the first were purposely left off, including Ben's assertion that the murdered man, Cole Clinton, an off-duty police officer, was committing adultery with his wife before the murder.

Mitchell and Harper research New Mexico law, and find a precedent which states that a murder that occurs during the adultery of a man's spouse is deemed justifiable homicide. Mitchell also reveals that the entire jury list is consisting of friends of Clinton, who was a popular man in town. Despite this, they feel that they finally have a solid defense for the case. After Harper goes to bed, Susan tells Mitchell she loves him.

The next morning, Mitchell, Morris Bixby, and Judge Tucker arrive to pick the jury. Mitchell and Bixby argue over the fairness of the case, and when picking the jury, Judge Tucker refuses to disqualify Clinton's friends and club members. At lunch, David finds that a local paper is being sold outside the court in view of the jurors and that the front page story features Ben's confession. Mitchell learns that Bixby leaked the confession to the press, knowing that the jurors will read it.

Back in court, a witness claims that Ben was abusive towards his wife in a bar and that he was eyeing Clinton's money. Another witness claims that Ben saw Clinton drop his money and that he clearly knew he had a large wad of bills on him. When Mitchell asserts that Clinton intended to spend the night with Laura-Mae, Mrs. Clinton faints.

After the day in court, Mitchell visits Mrs. Clinton at her request. She reveals that Mitchell's suspicions are true and that for the last few years, her husband was chasing younger women. She offers to plea for mercy for Ben if David drops his adultery defense out of respect for Clinton's daughter, who idolized her father. Mitchell refuses her offer, hoping to help Ben avoid being found guilty altogether.

Although an autopsy wasn't performed, Clinton's doctor alleges that he wasn't in the act of sexual intercourse during death. Bixby calls Clinton's widow to the stand despite Mitchell's objections. She says the accusations against her late husband are false, and although Mitchell could prove her wrong, he feels pity and refuses to cross-examine her.

The next day. Ben's commanding officer from his time in the Air Force testifies Ben changed after being married, going AWOL repeatedly to see his wife, becoming moody, and showing signs of mental instability. After being denied leave to look for his wife, he attempted to hang himself as well.

Mitchell then calls Ben to the stand. Ben tells how he first met his wife in a bar after seeing her dancing seductively at the jukebox. He was smitten by her and they danced and talked for hours. She accompanied him to his room, and despite just meeting her, Ben proposed marriage. She was arrested for prostitution, and after getting her out of jail, they began hitchhiking cross country where they met Mr. Clinton, who picked them up after seeing Laura-Mae. He showed his badge and gun, telling him not to worry about tickets. At a motel, Ben found Laura-Mae and Clinton together. He ran in as Clinton pulled his gun. In the struggle, Ben grabbed the gun and beat him to death with it. They fled in Clinton's car. Ben also tearfully admits he still loves his wife, and bears no ill will, even though she turned him in and applied for the reward money. Bixby begins his cross examination, asserting that Ben pimped his wife to Clinton, beating him to death when he refused. Bixby legally can't call Laura-Mae to the stand to testify against her husband, so he goads Mitchell into calling her, which he does. The judge dismisses the court before she can testify.

David visits Laura-Mae to get her to agree to tell the truth and realizes she is about to have company. He waits around and sees a man enter her room. Looking through the window, he realizes it is Judson Elliot, Bixby's co-prosecutor, and that he is having an affair with her despite being married and having four kids. In court the next morning, Laura-Mae takes the stand. As Bixby begins his cross examination, David reveals in the judge's quarters that he saw them and that he will reveal the story if they cross-examine her. He also finds out that Elliot is carrying Clinton's money clip, which Laura-Mae gave to him. After dismissing Elliot, Bixby refuses to compromise, and as court resumes, Harper arrives and is wheeled into the courtroom by Mitchell.

Mitchell begins his closing statement. He goes over all of the points of the trial as well as the conniving done by the state to protect Mr. Clinton's reputation and advance Bixby's career. Bixby's rebuttal emphasizes the confession and plays on the emotions of the jury, most of whom were friends with Clinton. He claims that they can't find Ben innocent without finding Clinton guilty. The jury retires to deliberate, and Harper jovially challenges Mitchell to declare his intentions for Susan.

Ben is found not guilty on all counts. Bixby is outraged at the loss, knowing it will hurt his career and curtail his ambitions. Harper confesses that Mitchell's newfound fame will make him the target of anyone in the Southwest in serious trouble, and passes the mantle to him. Mitchell declares his intentions for Susan, and the film ends with them sharing a kiss in front of the courthouse, then walking home.

Cast

Production
The film was based on a novel by Al Dewlin which won the McGraw-Hill Fiction Award in 1961. The New York Times called the book "absorbing". The Los Angeles Times called it "intensely compelling entertainment."

Film rights to the book were bought by the team of George Seaton and William Pearlberg who had a unit at MGM. They decided Pearlberg would produce but they would get in a new director while Seaton was making 36 Hours. Henry Denker wrote a script. In September 1962 Nick Adams signed to star.

In March 1963 the lead went to Richard Chamberlain, who was under contract to MGM and had become internationally famous playing Dr Kildare on television. This was slightly controversial because Chamberlain had a clean cut image and the novel was considered very adult. Boris Sagal, best known at the time for his work in television, signed to direct.

Joey Heatherton was cast off the back of her success in The Nurses. The cast also featured Linda Evans who was under contract to MGM at the time.

Filming took place in May 1963, during a break from filming Dr Kildare. It was part of a slate of movies that were among the first made by new MGM president Robert O'Brien.

Johnny Green returned to MGM for the first time in five years to write the music.

The film's copyright was renewed.

Awards
The film was nominated for two Academy Awards:
 Best Supporting Actor – Nick Adams
 Best Art Direction (George Davis, Paul Groesse, Henry Grace, Hugh Hunt)

See also
List of American films of 1963

References

External links

1963 films
1960s English-language films
1963 drama films
American black-and-white films
American courtroom films
Metro-Goldwyn-Mayer films
Films directed by Boris Sagal
Films scored by Johnny Green
American legal drama films
Films produced by William Perlberg
Films produced by George Seaton
1960s American films